Rota d'Imagna is a comune (municipality) in the Province of Bergamo in the Italian region of Lombardy, located about  northeast of Milan and about  northwest of Bergamo.

Rota d'Imagna borders the municipalities of Brumano, Corna Imagna, Locatello, Sant'Omobono Imagna, Valsecca.

Tourism 

Rota d’Imagna is considered the main tourism centre of the Imagna Valley because of its abundant and largely unspoilt natural landscape and spectacular mountain views. Offering various activities for different types of tourists, such as trekking, mountain walks, horse riding, relaxation in wellness centres and eno-gastronomic pleasures, Rota d’Imagna attracts many tourists from all over the world. The town is well known for providing sustainable tourism.

Attractions
The Church of Rota Fuori, dedicated to San Siro, is a major tourist attraction. It was built in 1496 and restructured in 1765, and it owns many art works of great significance including works of Gaetano Peverada, Pier Francesco Mazzucchelli and Carlo Ceresa together with other frescos and carvings dating back to the 17th century.

The Church of Rota Dentro, dedicated to San Gottardo, was built in 1496 and presents valuable granite portal and other significant art works.

Ca’ Piatone is a stately palace built in the 17th century, famous for being the birthplace of Giacomo Quarenghi, a well-known Italian architect.

Demographic evolution

References